Mathieu Robail (born 2 June 1985) is a retired French professional footballer who played as a midfielder.

Career
Born in Cambrai, Robail was signed by Lille as a youth player. He played for third-division side ES Wasquehal during the 2004–05 season, scoring three goals. In January 2010 he signed a six-month deal with SC Bastia after terminating his contract with Dijon.

In September 2015, Robail joined CA Bastia.

Coaching career
After retiring at the end of the 2019-20 season, Mathieu Robail began his coaching career with Iris Club de Croix, where he was appointed manager of their reserve team. Prior to that, Robail had assisted Johan Jacquesson at EFAFC's U17 team. In April 2021, he took up the position as assistant coach for Lambersart. Beside that, he would also coach the clubs U18 team.

Personal life
He has a twin brother, Samuel, who is also a footballer.

References

External links
 

Living people
1985 births
People from Cambrai
Sportspeople from Nord (French department)
French footballers
Association football midfielders
Lille OSC players
Dijon FCO players
Wasquehal Football players
SC Bastia players
Nîmes Olympique players
Paris FC players
CA Bastia players
Iris Club de Croix players
Entente Feignies Aulnoye FC players
Ligue 1 players
Ligue 2 players
Championnat National players
French twins
Twin sportspeople
Footballers from Hauts-de-France